
This is a list of the Areas of Special Scientific Interest (ASSIs) in County Fermanagh in Northern Ireland, United Kingdom.

In Northern Ireland the body responsible for designating ASSIs is the Northern Ireland Environment Agency – a division of the Department of Environment (DoE).

Unlike the SSSIs, ASSIs include both natural environments and man-made structures. As with SSSIs, these sites are designated if they have criteria based on fauna, flora, geological or physiographical features. On top of this, structures are also covered, such as the Whitespots mines in Conlig, according to several criterion including rarity, recorded history and intrinsic appeal.

For other sites in the rest of the United Kingdom, see List of SSSIs by Area of Search.

Data is available from the Northern Ireland Environment Agency's website in the form of citation sheets for each ASSI.

 Annachullion Lough ASSI
 Banagher ASSI
 Bellanaleck ASSI
 Beagh Big ASSI
 Blackslee ASSI
 Boho ASSI
 Braade ASSI
 Burdautien Lough ASSI
 Carrickbrawn ASSI
 Castle Coole ASSI
 Cladagh (Swanlinbar) River ASSI
 Conagher ASSI
 Coolcran ASSI
 Corraslough Point ASSI
 Cruninish Island ASSI
 Cuilcagh Mountain ASSI
 Dernish Island ASSI
 Devenish Island ASSI
 Drumacrittin Lough ASSI
 Drumbegger ASSI
 Drumlisaleen ASSI
 Edenaclough Wood ASSI
 Ederney Quarry ASSI
 Fardrum and Roosky Turloughs ASSI
 Finn Floods ASSI
 Garvros ASSI
 Glennasheevar ASSI
 Glen East ASSI
 Gravel Ridge Island
 Ground Bridge ASSI
 Hare Island ASSI
 Horse Island ASSI
 Inishroosk ASSI
 Keadew ASSI
 Killymackan Lough ASSI
 Kilnameel ASSI
 Kilroosky Lough ASSI
 Knockballymore Lough ASSI
 Knocknashangan ASSI
 Knockninny Hill ASSI
 Largalinny ASSI
 Largy Quarry
 Larkhill ASSI
 Lenaghan Wood ASSI
 Lergan ASSI
 Lough Aleater ASSI
 Lough Anierin ASSI
 Lough Corry ASSI
 Lough Melvin ASSI
 Lough Naman Bog and Lake ASSI
 Lough Scolban ASSI
 Lurgan River Wood ASSI
 Magheramenagh ASSI
 Makenny ASSI
 Mill Lough ASSI
 Monawilkin ASSI
 Moneendogue ASSI
 Moninea Bog ASSI
 Mullynaskeagh ASSI
 Paris Island Big ASSI
 Pettigoe Plateau ASSI
 Ross ASSI
 Slieve Beagh ASSI
 Summerhill Lough ASSI
 Tattenamona Bog ASSI
 Tedd ASSI
 Tempo River ASSI
 The Cliffs of Magho ASSI
 Tower More ASSI
 Tullanaguiggy ASSI
 Tullysranadeega ASSI
 Upper Lough Erne - Belleisle ASSI
 Upper Lough Erne - Crom ASSI
 Upper Lough Erne - Galloon ASSI
 Upper Lough Erne - Trannish ASSI
 West Fermanagh Scarplands ASSI

References

Areas of Special Scientific Interest in Northern Ireland
Geography of County Fermanagh
Areas of Special Scientific